Danielle Maxwell (born 9 April 2002) is a Northern Irish association footballer who plays as a midfielder for Women's Premiership club Glentoran WFC and the Northern Ireland women's national team.

References

External links

2002 births
Living people
Women's association football midfielders
Women's association footballers from Northern Ireland
Northern Ireland women's international footballers
Glentoran F.C.  players